Paul Salman (born 25 January 1886 in Damascus, Syria - died on 1 July 1948) was the first Archbishop of the Melkite Greek Catholic Church who, on May 2, 1932 by Pope Pius XI became the archeparch Melkite Greek Catholic Archeparchy of Petra and Philadelphia in Amman.

Life

Salman was ordained on July 20, 1911. His appointment as Archbishop he received at the founding of the Archeparchy on 5 June 1932, then he became a consecrated bishop. After the official confirmation on 13 May 1933, he provided his archbishop's service until his death on July 1, 1948. Salman was succeeded by Mikhayl Assaf.

References

External links
 http://www.catholic-hierarchy.org/bishop/bsalman.html 
 http://www.gcatholic.org/dioceses/diocese/petr0.htm

1886 births
1948 deaths
People from Damascus
Melkite Greek Catholic bishops
Syrian Melkite Greek Catholics
20th-century Roman Catholic bishops in Jordan